Cymothoe altisidora is a butterfly in the family Nymphalidae. It is found in Cameroon, the Republic of the Congo and the Democratic Republic of the Congo.

References

Butterflies described in 1869
Cymothoe (butterfly)
Butterflies of Africa
Taxa named by William Chapman Hewitson